Mandalay District is a district of the Mandalay Division in central Myanmar. Though the district used to consist of two cities, Mandalay and Amarapura, today, with the urban sprawl of Mandalay capturing Amarapura and Patheingyi, the district and the city of Mandalay are one and the same.

Townships

Mandalay District consists of the following townships and towns.

Aungmyethazan Township
Chanayethazan Township
Chanmyathazi Township
Maha Aungmye Township
Pyigyidagun Township
Amarapura Township
Amarapura
Myitnge
Patheingyi Township
Patheingyi

References

 
Districts of Myanmar
Mandalay Region